WRED may refer to:

 Weighted random early detection, a queue management algorithm used in computer networking
 WRED (AM), a radio station (1440 AM) licensed to Westbrook, Maine, United States
 WPEI, a radio station (95.9 FM) licensed to Saco, Maine, United States, which used the call signs WRED from July 1995 to September 2008 and WRED-FM during September 2008